John Dawson was an Australian politician and solicitor. He was one of Charles Cowper's 21 appointees to the New South Wales Legislative Council in May 1861, but never took his seat.

References

External links
 Parliament of New South Wales

Year of birth unknown
Year of death missing
Members of the New South Wales Legislative Council